"Wild Night" is a song written by Northern Irish singer-songwriter Van Morrison and is the opening track on his fifth studio album Tupelo Honey. It was released as a single in 1971 and reached number 28 on the Billboard Hot 100 chart. In 2022, the song peaked at #1 on the radio airplay chart in Canada.

Morrison has continued to perform it in concerts throughout his career and it has been recorded by many artists and bands. A new version recorded by John Mellencamp and Meshell Ndegeocello in 1994 peaked at number three on the Billboard Hot 100 in the summer of that year and reached number one in Canada for three weeks.

Recording and composition
"Wild Night" was first recorded during a session with Lewis Merenstein as producer at Warners Publishing Studio in New York City in autumn 1968. The version released on Tupelo Honey was recorded in spring 1971 at Wally Heider Studios in San Francisco with Ted Templeman as producer.

Reception
Tom Maginnis in Allmusic describes it as: "an effusive three and a half minutes of Stax-inspired R&B, buoyed by a sweet guitar lick from Ronnie Montrose of such quality that would make Steve Cropper proud."  Cash Box described the song as an "intriguing self penned composition," praising the "electrifying vocal and musical performance"

Reviewing Tupelo Honey in Uncut magazine, David Cavanagh wrote of "Wild Night": "Recorded live in the studio (as all Morrison's albums are), it sounds intricately layered, highly sophisticated by 2007's standards, like speeded-up Steely Dan meets Allen Toussaint.  It's fluid but meticulous; ultra-rehearsed but effortless.  It promises a party to come."

"Wild Night" as originally recorded by Morrison was rated at No. 747 on Dave Marsh's 1989 book, The Heart of Rock and Soul, The 1001 Greatest Singles Ever.

Other releases
"Wild Night" has remained a popular tune performed by Morrison at many of his concerts from 1970 to 2009. It featured as one of the closing songs during his appearance as the first day headline act at the Austin City Limits Music Festival in September 2006. It was included in the Limited Edition Album, Live at Austin City Limits Festival recorded from the performance.  The song was used on the soundtrack of the movie Twenty Four Seven and as such is one of the nineteen movie hits featured on Morrison's 2007 compilation album, Van Morrison at the Movies - Soundtrack Hits. The original as remastered in 2007 is one of the hits included on the compilation album, Still on Top - The Greatest Hits.
"Wild Night"  was included on the 2003 (10 CD) set Ultimate Seventies Collection by Time-Life.

A live performance is also one of the songs performed on Morrison's 1980 concert disc on the Live at Montreux 1980/1974 DVD released in 2006.

Personnel
Van Morrison – rhythm guitar, vocals
Ronnie Montrose – electric guitars
Bill Church  – bass
Luis Gasca – trumpet
Gary Mallaber – percussion
John McFee – pedal steel guitar
Rick Shlosser – drums
Jack Schroer – alto and baritone saxophones

Charts

Release history

Martha Reeves version

In 1974, Martha Reeves recorded a version of the song for her self-titled debut solo album, and was released as a single. it reached number seventy-four on the R&B charts and at number 95 in Australia. Reeves' version of the song was featured in the 1991 film Thelma & Louise.

Charts

Release history

John Mellencamp and Meshell Ndegeocello version

American musicians John Mellencamp and Meshell Ndegeocello recorded a version of "Wild Night" and released it as a single in 1994. The song was included on Mellencamp's 1994 album, Dance Naked and an "acoustic" remix was released as a promotional single for radio. This version of the song reached number three on the US Billboard Hot 100 during mid-1994 and remained in the top 40 for 33 weeks. It also topped the US Adult Contemporary chart for eight weeks, the Canadian RPM Top Singles chart for three weeks, and the RPM Adult Contemporary chart for one week. It sold 500,000 copies in the US. A live version by Mellencamp and Ndegeocello appears on Mellencamp's 1999 album Rough Harvest.

Music videos
Two music videos were filmed for "Wild Night". The first music video for "Wild Night" features Mellencamp, his backing band, and Ndegeocello performing the song in a hall and basement, and continues throughout the video. 

Another video for "Wild Night" was filmed, it begins when a cab driver in Chicago (portrayed by American model Shana Zadrick) turns on the radio, the song comes on, gets dressed for work (matching with the opening lyrics) and drives around her various fares (with passengers such as a filmmaker, driving past a place with a sign that reads "60s-70s Dance Hits", possibly a reference to the original or Reeves's version, Mellencamp's then-drummer Kenny Aronoff, a newlywed couple, a man and his dogs, a surfer, and many more) intercut with scenes from the first video, with a few minor differences.

Charts

Weekly charts

Year-end charts

Sales

|}

References

Heylin, Clinton (2003). Can You Feel the Silence? Van Morrison: A New Biography, Chicago Review Press, 
The Billboard Book of Top 40 Hits, 6th Edition, 1996

1971 singles
1974 singles
1994 singles
Van Morrison songs
John Mellencamp songs
Meshell Ndegeocello songs
Songs written by Van Morrison
Male–female vocal duets
RPM Top Singles number-one singles
Song recordings produced by Ted Templeman
1971 songs
Warner Records singles
MCA Records singles
Mercury Records singles
Song recordings produced by Van Morrison